East Walnut Hills is a neighborhood on the Southeast side of Cincinnati, Ohio.  The population was 4,103 at the 2020 census.

Demographics

Source - City of Cincinnati Statistical Database

History
Founded in 1867 as the incorporated Village of Woodburn, East Walnut Hills is known as the home to many prominent Cincinnatians. Initially developed by combining a small German Catholic community and the suburban estates of Cincinnati businessmen, the village was annexed into Cincinnati by 1873.

Historic architecture and former residents
The neighborhood includes a historic district between the O'Bryonville business district (Evanston) and the DeSales Corner, home to mansions with large setbacks, as well as Annwood Park on Madison Road and the Bettman Preserve, an urban nature preserve.  Large estates line William Howard Taft Road, with views of the Ohio River and Downtown Cincinnati.  Many older homes in the areas surrounding St. Ursula Academy are being subdivided and converted into condominiums. East Walnut Hills is home to the historic Saint Francis De Sales Catholic Church and School, at the intersection of Madison Road and Woodburn Avenue and Purcell Marian High School. East Walnut Hills' historic homes demonstrate several architectural styles. Examples of the Romantic period, Colonial Revival, Tudor Revival, Queen Ann, Romanesque, Italian Revival, and English Country Revival can be seen.  The homes of East Walnut Hills are often featured in local historic home and garden tours.

Formerly known as Madisonville Pike in the early 1850s, Madison Road is the site of the earliest development in the neighborhood. The historic John S. Baker House was designed by Cincinnati Architect James Keys Wilson.  Other prominent East Walnut Hills residents are William W. Scarborough, grocery merchant, Joshua Hall Bates, a Union general who built his home in 1858, and Civil War veteran and heir to a liquor baron Charles Dexter.

The neighborhood is known as an urban forest because of the number of large trees.  There is also a bird sanctuary between Wold Ave and Dexter Place.

See also
John S. Baker House, located in East Walnut Hills

References

External links 
Official Neighborhood Site

Neighborhoods in Cincinnati
Former municipalities in Ohio